Karlen Grigori Adamyan (born  19 January 1937) is an Armenian cardiologist, Doctor of Medical Sciences (1971), Professor (1985), Academician of the Armenian National Academy of Sciences (1996).

In 2009 he was named Honoured Science Worker of Armenia.

Career 
Adamyan graduated Yerevan State Medical Institute in 1959. From 1962 to 1965 he was a postgraduate student at the Institute of Cardiology and Heart Surgery of Ministry of Health of the ASSR, after which he started working for the same institute. in 1972-1982 he transferred to the atherosclerotic cardiovascular disease department. In 1979, he became the director of Yerevan Research Institute of Cardiology. in 1995, he became the Head of the Chair of Clinical Cardiology of the National Institute of Health, as well as filled the position of Chief Cardiologist at the Ministry of Health of Armenia (1979-2001).

Author of 497 scientific papers, and 10 monographs.

Adamyan has been credited for developing the functional heart failure concept in cases of atherosclerotic cardiovascular disease and birth defects and for suggesting the classification of the pre-cyclone stage of circulatory collapse. Adamyan has introduced the biomedicine and immunology directions in clinical cardiology. Adamyan main research has been in the fields of primary and secondary prevention of pulmonary hypertension and cardiac ischemic disease.

Awards and recognitions 
Medal after Mkhitar Heratsi, 
Order of Friendship of nations, gold medal after Evgeniy Chazov (2007),
Gold anniversary medal of National Health Institute of Armenia (2007), 
Gold medal of meria of Yerevan city administration (2011), 
Special diploma of presidium of Russian Society of Cardiology for development of cardiology (one of the tree diplomas with Yevgeniy Chazov and Rafael Oganov). 
State premium of the Armenian SSR in sphere of science and technics (1988).

References

External links
 Karlen G. Adamyan

1937 births
Living people
Armenian cardiologists
Soviet cardiologists
Yerevan State Medical University alumni
People from Gyumri
Physicians from Yerevan